General elections to the Cortes Generales were held in Spain on the 15 January 1869. At stake were all 352 seats in the Congress of Deputies, plus 11 Puerto Rican and 18 Cuban additional seats.

History
The 1869 elections were the first ones after the Glorious Revolution of 1869, and also the first ones in the Sexenio Democrático.

Results

References

 CONGRESO DE LOS DIPUTADOS - HISTORICO DE DIPUTADOS 1810-1977
  Elecciones Cortes Constituyentes - 15 de enero de 1869

1869 elections in Spain
1869 in Spain
1869
January 1869 events